The Rain or Shine Elasto Painters are a professional basketball team in the Philippine Basketball Association owned by Asian Coatings Philippines, Inc. It debuted in the league in the 2006–07 PBA season after acquiring the franchise rights of the Shell Turbo Chargers in 2006, which disbanded after the 2004–05 PBA season.

From 1996 to 2006, the franchise played in the Philippine Basketball League, carrying the name Welcoat House Paints, Welcoat Paintmasters and the St. Benilde-Rain or Shine Elasto Painters, winning a total of six championships.

Beginnings

Philippine Basketball League (1996–2006) 

The Rain or Shine Elasto Painters debuted in the Philippine Basketball League in 1996 as the Welcoat Paint Masters. Its first championship came in the 1999 Challenge Cup, winning 3–0 over Red Bull Energy Drink. Welcoat was considered as one of the two teams to enter the PBA before the 2000 season but lost out to Red Bull. Since then, the Paint Masters won five more championships, fielding in the best amateur and former Metropolitan Basketball Association players available, most notably Don Allado, Renren Ritualo, Yancy de Ocampo, Rommel Adducul, Ronald Tubid, James Yap, Paul Artadi, and Jay Washington. One of its biggest rivals from 2000 to 2002 was Shark Energy Drink, with PBA players Chester Tolomia (later joined Welcoat in 2004), Roger Yap, and later Rain or Shine member Gilbert Malabanan, as both teams engaged in four straight finals series, splitting both series in the process.

In 2005, Welcoat changed its name to Rain or Shine Elasto Painters, one of the products of their parent company, Welbest. The Elasto Painters made it all the way to the finals of the Heroes Cup against Magnolia. After leading the series 2–0, Rain or Shine suffered one of the biggest collapses in league history as the Wizards won the series in five games. In the 2006 PBL Unity Cup, the Elasto Painters were swept in the semifinals by the Toyota-Otis Sparks to end their four consecutive finals appearance, but placed third in a one-game playoff against Montaña Pawnshop on June 8. Prior to the start of Game 3 of the Unity Cup title series between Harbour Centre and Toyota-Otis on June 13, 2006, the league awarded the team with the Dynasty Award for their 10 years of success in the league. Several past and present members of the Welcoat franchise were on hand, as they brought their six championship trophies during the ceremony.

Acquiring a PBA franchise 

After Shell's departure in the PBA in 2005, the league gave Shell an ultimatum of until early 2006 to either announce their return to the league for the 06–07 season, or to sell the franchise to a prospective buyer. In several press releases and interview, then-PBA Commissioner Noli Eala mentioned that some companies were interested in joining the league, although he did not stress which of these companies were. One of Eala's vision was for the PBA to be a 12-team league. Welcoat suddenly came into the picture, expressing interest to buy the Shell franchise. By January 2006, major newspapers reported that the Welcoat team is nearing the completion of acquiring the Shell team. By February, the PBA announced the entry of Welcoat as the 10th PBA team for the 2006–2007 season. People's Journal said that the turnover was approved between P30-40 million, a big drop from the original P60 million the Turbo Chargers wanted 
The Manila Times, however, reported that it was close to P55 million that Shell wanted 

Welcoat put out P60 million as bond for five years, P7 million for participation fee and another P6 million for transfer fee.

As incentive, the PBA allowed Welcoat to grab three amateur players from their Rain or Shine PBL team. The Paint Masters named Jay-R Reyes, Junjun Cabatu, and NCAA Most Valuable Player Jay Sagad as the three players from the core of its amateur team which they elevated into the pros directly. Welcoat also signed PBL veterans Niño Gelig, undrafted point guard Froilan Baguion, Jercules Tangkay, and former Shell players Adonis Sta. Maria and Rob Wainwright. In the dispersal draft, Welcoat took Gilbert Lao from Coca-Cola and Denver Lopez from San Miguel.

In August 2006, Welcoat announced that they will be named as the Welcoat Dragons in their pro stint while also grabbing former UP Fighting Maroons players Abby Santos and Jireh Ibañes as the team's new rookies, although Santos failed to sign with the team.

Welcoat Dragons (2006–2008) 

In its PBA debut, Welcoat lost to eventual champion Barangay Ginebra Kings in the season-opening game of the 2006-07 PBA season, 102–69. Jojo Tangkay scored the team's first-ever basket in the league. Denver Lopez led the team with 12 points while rookie Jay-R Reyes had 10 for the Dragons. The Dragons won its first victory on October 9 defeating Coca-Cola. Their next two victories came at the hands of the San Miguel Beermen and the Talk 'N Text Phone Pals. Despite a 3–5 record, Welcoat lost their next 10 games along with injuries to key players that eventually ended their campaign with a 3–15 record, the only team to be eliminated after the elimination round of the 2006-07 PBA Philippine Cup.

During the 2007 PBA Fiesta Conference, the Dragons had two active imports, Wayland White and assistant coach Alex Compton. The other imports, Charles Clark and Rob Sanders, preceded White. The Dragons were again the first team to be eliminated in the Fiesta Conference by the hands of the Purefoods Tender Juicy Giants. The Dragons finished with a 7–29 record for the 2006–07 PBA season and was awarded the first overall draft pick after they won the draft lottery. They eventually selected Joe Devance of University of Texas at El Paso.

Before the start of the 2008 PBA Fiesta Conference, Leo Austria resigned as head coach of the Dragons citing that the management wanted a new direction. Then-assistant coach Caloy Garcia was named interim head coach on March 18 and would eventually become the team's official head coach. The Dragons finished with another 7–29 record and failed to qualify again for the playoffs in either of the two conferences.

Rain or Shine Elasto Painters (2008–present)

2008–2009 season 
In 2008, a new name was introduced for the team – Rain or Shine Elasto Painters. At the 2008 PBA Draft held at Market! Market!, Taguig, the team drafted Gabe Norwood of George Mason University as the first overall pick. In the 2nd round, the Elasto Painters grabbed point guard Tyrone Tang of De La Salle University. 24 hours after the draft proper, the team traded 2007 first overall pick Joe Devance and their 2009 and 2010 second-round picks to the Alaska Aces in exchange for Alaska's 2009 1st-round pick, number five overall Solomon Mercado, and veteran Eddie Laure.

They defeated Air21 on their first game of the 2008–2009 Philippine Cup, 120–102 to spark a surprise showing at the 2008-09 PBA Philippine Cup. The Elasto Painters were aiming for a semifinal berth when they were defeated by the eventual champions Talk 'N Text Tropang Texters in the elimination round. With a record of 10–8, they faced the defending champions Sta. Lucia Realtors in the quarterfinals where they were swept 2–0 in the best-of-3 series, with Norwood and Mercado being ejected in Game 1. Their 10-win record surpassed their best performance in a season.

During the Fiesta Conference, the Elasto Painters took import Charles Clark but was soon replaced by heavyweight Jai Lewis, a former college teammate of Gabe Norwood. Ace play-maker Sol Mercado got injured before their quarterfinals game with Purefoods. Despite a depleted lineup, the Elasto Painters defeated Purefoods led by Gabe Norwood and point guard Tyrone Tang in the absence of Mercado. Tang made a three-point shot to take the lead with 31 seconds left, they won and made it to the semifinals for the first time in franchise history. They were then eliminated by the Barangay Ginebra Kings in the semifinals, ending their season with promise.

2011–2012 season 
In the 2011 PBA Commissioner's Cup, they made the franchise best start, 3–0 under Yeng Guiao. In the 2011-12 PBA Philippine Cup, they finished 9–5, 5th place because of an inferior quotient on Ginebra and Petron. They swept the crowd favorite Barangay Ginebra Kings, 2–0 to advance to their 3rd semifinals appearance. They faced the 8th-seeded Powerade Tigers
who eliminated the top-seeded crowd favorite B-Meg Llamados but they are eliminated, 3–4.

2012–2013 season 
The team made history during the 2012 PBA Commissioner's Cup by signing the Croatian center Bruno Šundov. He served as a center in Croatian basketball team and was the first European player to play in the league.

In the 2012 PBA Governors Cup, they found their franchise best start, 4–0. They won 107–100, 100–94*, 106–92 and 93–90 over Alaska Aces, B-Meg Llamados, Air21 Express and Barangay Ginebra Kings on Paul Lee's winning triple 2.6 seconds remaining but lost on archrival Powerade, 98–104.
* Rain or Shine won via overtime.

They made their first final appearance after winning against B-Meg Llamados at a very crucial game, 92–82, under the leadership of coach Yeng Guiao on 2012 PBA Governor's Cup, though after that loss, B-Meg Llamados won over a do-or-die game against the Barangay Ginebra Kings for the remaining slot for the finals.

On their debut game for the 2012 Governor's Cup, Rain or Shine Elasto Painters won a very physical game against B-Meg Llamados 91–80. The team had a disappointing loss on Game Two where their rookie, Paul Lee, re-injured his left shoulder 80–85. Even without Paul Lee, the team bounced back on their third and fourth games, 93–84 and 94–89, respectively, to lead the series 3–1. However, the team lost both Game 5 and 6 with B-Meg forcing a winner-take-all Game 7. On August 5, 2012, the six-year-old franchise won their first Championship title after handing B-Meg an 83–76 game loss. The undermanned team led by coach Yeng Guiao along with their import Jamelle Cornley and the local Jeff Chan, who won the Finals MVP, grabbed the lead early in the third quarter after B-Meg Llamados' import Marqus Blakely had foul trouble.

2013–2014 season 

In 2013-14 PBA Philippine Cup they finished the eliminations in 2nd place of the standings. They beat GlobalPort Batang Pier in the quarterfinals in one game. They also beat Petron Blaze Boosters in 4–1 series win in the semifinals, despite coach Yeng Guiao having suspended in Game 5. They faced San Mig Super Coffee Mixers in the finals but lost to them in 6 games.

2014–2015 season 
In 2014-15 PBA Philippine Cup they finished the eliminations in 2nd seed of the standings and they got the automatic semifinals slot as the new format in the Philippine Cup playoffs was changed. They face Alaska in the Semifinals but lost in 6 games. In 2015 PBA Commissioner's Cup, they chose Rick Jackson as their temporary import to wait for Wayne Chism to release from Hapoel Gilboa Galil of Israel. On February 16, Wayne is now ready to play for Rain or Shine and set his debut on February 20. They finished 1st in the eliminations via quotient system. It is the first time that they finished the top spot since 2012 PBA Governors Cup. They beat Brgy. Ginebra in a crucial game; 92–91. They sweep Meralco in the best-of-three semifinals to face Talk 'N Text Tropang Texters in the Finals. They lost the game 7 in overtime. But in the middle of the Commissioner's Cup, they release their resident import for the Governors Cup Arizona Reid to play for San Miguel Beermen to replace Ronald Roberts. Many fans of Rain or Shine was shocked after they heard the news, because of this, in 2015 PBA Governors' Cup, they choose former Alaska import Wendell McKines as their import. They finished 3rd place of the standings, in the Quarterfinals, they beat Barako Bull Energy in overtime by Paul Lee's layup, but lost to San Miguel in 4 games at the best of five Semifinals.

2015–2016 season 
In the 2015 PBA draft many analysts in their mock draft choose either chose Arthur dela Cruz or Norbert Torres for the third pick, but the team selected Maverick Ahanmisi, then Josan Nimes on the 12th pick and Don Trollano on the 2nd-round pick. In 2015-16 PBA Philippine Cup, they finished 3rd in the standings and advanced to the playoffs, beating Blackwater in the first phase of the quarterfinals and TNT in the second phase of the quarterfinals. But they lost to San Miguel in the semifinals in six games. In the 2016 PBA Commissioner's Cup, they signed Wayne Chism to be their import for the third time, although Wayne was injured his hamstring during the game against Meralco on February 17, he was doubtful to play for the rest of the conference. They chose Antoine Wright to replace Chism but he was replaced by Mo Charlo on March 8. While approaching the playoffs, they chose Pierre Henderson-Niles to replace the undersized Charlo to match-up against their possible opponents in the playoffs including Greg Slaughter and June Mar Fajardo. With Henderson-Niles,  a 6'8" center to help the team as an inside presence in the paint, they finished 5th place in the standings and swept Ginebra in the quarterfinals and finally beat San Miguel in 4 games at the best-of-five semifinals. They faced the Alaska in the finals and finally they won their 2nd championship in their franchise history in 6 games which Paul Lee was named Finals MVP. In the 2016 PBA Governors' Cup, they selected Dior Lowhorn as their import, then after losing back to back games in the middle of the conference, they signed Jason Forte to replace Lowhorn on September. After two games, he was replaced by Josh Dollard. Unfortunately, Rain or Shine failed to gain the last spot to qualify to the playoffs after losing to Phoenix, 94–105. This would also be Guiao's last tenure as Rain or Shine's head coach.

2016–2017 season 
On October 5, Yeng Guiao signed with the NLEX Road Warriors. This prompted assistant coach Caloy Garcia to return as the head coach of the team starting next season. On October 13, their starting point guard, Lee was traded to Star in exchange for James Yap. On the same day, J.R. Quiñahan was also traded to GlobalPort in exchange for Jay Washington. On October 14, Josan Nimes was traded to Mahindra for a second-round draft pick in 2018. The team hired two former PBA players, Jolly Escobar and Matthew Makalintal to be the new assistant coaches of Rain or Shine.

Current roster

Head coaches

Season-by-season records 

Records from the 2022–23 PBA season:
*one-game playoffs**team had the twice-to-beat advantage

Players of note

Members of the PBA's 25 greatest players 
 Samboy Lim, former player, assistant coach and consultant in their Philippine Basketball League squad.

Other notable players 
Ryan Araña
Junjun Cabatu
Jervy Cruz
Paul Lee
Jonathan Uyloan
J.R. Quiñahan
Jay-R Reyes
Jay Sagad
Ty Tang
Jeff Chan
J. R. Quiñahan
Chris Tiu

Coaches 
Leo Austria (2006–2008)
Caloy Garcia (2008–2011)
Yeng Guiao (2011–2016)
Caloy Garcia (2016–2020)
Chris Gavina (2021–2022)
Yeng Guiao (2022–present)

Records

PBL Championships 
1999 1st PBL Challenge Cup (def. Red Bull 3–0)
1999 2nd PBL Challenge Cup (def. ANA Water Dispenser 3–0)
2000 PBL Chairman's Cup (def. Shark Energy Drink 4–0)
2001 PBL Cup (def. Shark Energy Drink 4–0)
2002 PBL Challenge Cup (def. Dazz 3–0)
2005 PBL Unity Cup (def. Montaña 3–1)

PBA Championships 
2012 PBA Governors Cup (def. B-Meg Llamados 4–3) Game 7 series
2016 PBA Commissioners Cup (def. Alaska Aces 4–2)

See also 
Rain or Shine Elasto Painters draft history

References

External links 
Official website
Enter the Dragons: Welcoat undergoes a ‘paint-staking’ makeover
MYPBL.com: Rain or Shine
PhilippineNews.com: Welcoat team: ‘Genesis’ of great players
Sunstar Cebu: PBA offers franchise to Welcoat Paints
Manila Times: Welcoat poised to enter PBA via Shell’s franchise
Journal: Welcoat joins PBA family
Manila Times: PBA welcomes Welcoat Paints as 10th member
PBA.ph: Welcoat wants Compton in PBA debut

 
Basketball teams established in 1996
Former Philippine Basketball League teams
1996 establishments in the Philippines